Veraval Junction railway station is a railway station in the city of Veraval, Gujarat. It is under Bhavnagar railway division of Western Railway Zone of Indian Railways. Veraval Junction is "A" category station of Bhavnagar railway division of Western Railway zone.

It is located at 7 m above sea level and has five platforms. As of 2016, a single diesel broad-gauge railway line exists. Fourteen  trains halt, seven trains originate and eight trains terminate at this station. Diu Airport is 64 km away.

Major trains

The following trains start from Veraval Junction railway station:

 22991/92 Bandra Terminus–Veraval Superfast Express
 19569/70 Rajkot–Veraval Express
 16333/34 Thiruvananthapuram Veraval Express
 11087/88 Veraval–Pune Express
 19319/20 Veraval–Indore Mahamana Express
 22957/58 Somnath Superfast Express
 19217/18 Saurashtra Janta Express

The following trains halt at Veraval Junction railway station:

 11465/66 Somnath–Jabalpur Express (via Bina)
 11463/64 Somnath–Jabalpur Express (via Itarsi)
 19119/20 Ahmedabad–Somnath Intercity Express
 19251/52 Somnath–Okha Express

References

Railway stations in Gir Somnath district
Bhavnagar railway division
Railway junction stations in Gujarat
Transport in Veraval